
Gmina Gostycyn is a rural gmina (administrative district) in Tuchola County, Kuyavian-Pomeranian Voivodeship, in north-central Poland.

The gmina contains part of the protected area called Tuchola Landscape Park.

Villages
Gmina Gostycyn contains the villages and settlements of Bagienica, Gostycyn, Kamienica, Łyskowo, Mała Klonia, Motyl, Piła, Pruszcz, Przyrowa, Świt, Wielka Klonia, Wielki Mędromierz and Żółwiniec.

Neighbouring gminas
Gmina Gostycyn is bordered by the gminas of Cekcyn, Kęsowo, Koronowo, Lubiewo, Sępólno Krajeńskie, Sośno and Tuchola.

References
 Polish official population figures 2006

Gostycyn
Tuchola County